The Communist Party of Western Belorussia (KPZB) was a banned political party in the Interwar Poland, active in the territory of present-day West Belarus from 1923 until 1939; in Polesie (1932–1933) Słonim county (1934) and Vilnius.

History
The party was founded in 1923 in Wilno by representatives of the Belarusian communist circles from Wilno, Białystok and Brest with logistical help from the Bolsheviks. Although its name, the Communist Party of Western Belarus, could suggest a desire for independence of Belarus, wrote historian Sergiusz Łukasiewicz, in reality the party aimed for the transfer of eastern provinces of Poland to the Soviet Union. As this constituted high treason, the party was illegalized by the Polish authorities.

The party's political program included a socialist revolution in Poland and unification of Western Belorussia with the Belarusian Soviet Socialist Republic in the USSR. The party worked undercover; in 1925-1927 it masked its illegal activities under the legal Belarusian Peasants' and Workers' Union in Poland. It received support from the Soviet Union with leadership brought in secretly from across the border (see Vera Kharuzhaya).

In 1938, following a decision by the Comintern on the orders of Joseph Stalin, the KPZB along with the Communist Party of Poland and the Communist Party of Western Ukraine were delegalized by the USSR under the charge of affiliation with the Polish bourgeoisie. Following the Soviet invasion of Poland and the annexation of Western Belarus to the Soviet Union in 1939, many former members of the KPZB were repressed, others joined the Communist Party of Byelorussia, the East Belarusian branch of the Communist Party of the Soviet Union.

Notable members

 Siarhei Prytytski, future Chairman of Presidium of the Supreme Soviet of Belarus (1968-1971)
 Branislaw Tarashkyevich, linguist, writer, later executed by the Soviets in 1938
Mikalai Dvornikau, commander of the Ukrainian interbrigade company Taras Shevchenko, died in a battle in 1938
 Maksim Tank, future multiple times awarded writer, Chairman of the Supreme Soviet of Belarus (1965–1971)
 Vera Kharuzhaya, later executed by Nazis in 1942

References

Edwarda Orłowska, Pamiętam jak dziś, Książka i Wiedza, Warsaw 1973. 

1923 establishments in Poland
1938 disestablishments in the Soviet Union
Banned communist parties
Communist parties in Belarus
Defunct communist parties in Poland
Defunct political parties in Belarus
Political parties disestablished in 1938
Political parties established in 1923
Political parties of minorities in Poland
Political repression in the Soviet Union
Western Belorussia (1918–1939)
Communist Party of Western Belorussia
Separatism in Poland